Malcolm Bow may refer to:
Malcolm Ross Bow (1887–1982), Canadian public health officer
Malcolm Norman Bow (1918–2005), Canadian diplomat